The Aero Commander 500 family is a series of light-twin piston-engined and turboprop aircraft originally built by the Aero Design and Engineering Company in the late 1940s, renamed the Aero Commander company in 1950, and a division of Rockwell International from 1965. The initial production version was the 200-mph, seven-seat Aero Commander 520. An improved version, the 500S, manufactured after 1967, is known as the Shrike Commander.  Larger variants are known by numerous model names and designations, ranging up to the 330-mph, 11-seat Model 695B/Jetprop 1000B turboprop.

Design and development

The idea for the Commander light business twin was conceived by Ted Smith, a project engineer at the Douglas Aircraft Company. Working part-time after hours throughout 1944, a group of A-20 engineers formed the Aero Design and Engineering Company to design and build the proposed aircraft with a layout similar to their A-20 bomber. Originally, the new company was going to build three pre-production aircraft, but as the first aircraft was being built, they decided to build just one prototype. The final configuration was completed in July 1946 and was designated the Model L3805.

Registered NX1946, the prototype first flew on 23 April 1948. The L3805 accommodated up to five people and was powered by two Lycoming O-435-A piston engines., it was an all-metal high-wing monoplane with retractable undercarriage using components from a Vultee BT-13 Valiant. The market segment planned for this aircraft to be sold to small feeder airliner firms and was originally designed to carry seven passengers, but instead found use in the private business aircraft and military market. Walter Beech test flew the aircraft in 1949 and expressed interest in buying the project, but passed on it, to instead develop the Beechcraft Twin Bonanza. Fairchild Aircraft also evaluated the prototype at its Hagerstown, Maryland, headquarters.

The prototype flew successfully and the company leased, at no cost, a new 26,000 square-foot factory at Bethany near Oklahoma City to build a production version, certified on 30 June 1950. Nearly 10,000 hours of redesign work went into the model, including more powerful Lycoming GO-435-C2 engines, with a combined rating of 520 horsepower. The production model was named the Commander 520. The first Commander 520 was rolled out of the new factory in August 1951. Serial number 1 was used as a demonstrator, then sold in October 1952 to the Asahi Shimbun Press Company of Tokyo.

Operational history

In military service it was initially designated the L-26, though in 1962 this was changed to U-4 for the United States Air Force and U-9 for the United States Army.

Under ownership of Rockwell in the 1960s, World War II pilot R. A. "Bob" Hoover demonstrated the Shrike Commander 500S for decades in a variety of "managed energy" routines, including single-engine and engine-out aerobatics. His Shrike Commander is displayed in the colors of his last sponsor, Evergreen International Aviation, at the Steven F. Udvar-Hazy Center of the Smithsonian National Air and Space Museum. Bob Odegaard continued the tradition in 2012, flying a 1975 Shrike 500S in a Bob Hoover tribute routine.

One U-4B became a presidential transport aircraft for Dwight D. Eisenhower between 1956 and 1960. This was the smallest "Air Force One," and the first to wear the now-familiar blue-and-white livery. This aircraft is now owned by the Commemorative Air Force.

As of 2004 Shrike Commanders remained in service with the United States Customs Service and United States Coast Guard.

A single 560F was operated by the Belgian Air Force as the personal transport of the late king Baudouin of Belgium from 1961 to 1973.

According to the July 1, 1968 Frontier Airlines (1950-1986) system timetable, series 500 aircraft were being operated on scheduled passenger flights by Combs Aviation on behalf of Frontier via a contract agreement with service to several smaller communities in Montana and Wyoming at this time.

The unpressurized, long-fuselage 680FL was operated as a small package freighter by Combs Freightair in the 1970s and 1980s, and by Suburban Air Freight in the 1980s and 1990s.  The aircraft was popular with pilots, because it was extremely "pilot friendly" and with its 380 hp supercharged engines did well in icing meteorological conditions.  A number are still operated on contracts for cargo and fire control applications, as their piston engines offer good fuel specifics at low altitudes and longer loiter times.

Wing spar fatigue

Beginning in June 1991, senior engineers met with FAA officials to discuss concerns over the Aero Commander's main wing spar, which was believed to be susceptible to stress fatigue and subsequent cracking, and was believed to have resulted in a number of fatal crashes. From approximately 1961 to 1993, 24 aircraft crashed when spar failures caused the loss of the wing in flight. 35 more spars were found cracked during inspections.

Single-engine safety

In 1950, when the developers were working to satisfy Civil Aeronautics Authority (CAA) regulations for certification of the 500, they chose a novel method of demonstrating its single-engine safety and performance: they removed one of the two-bladed propellers, secured it in the aft cabin, and flew from Bethany to Washington, D.C. on one engine. There they met with CAA personnel, then replaced the propeller and returned to Oklahoma in the conventional manner. The flight received nationwide coverage in the press.

In 1979, the National Transportation Safety Board reviewed light-twin engine-failure accidents, involving the 24 most popular model-groups of light twins between 1972 and 1976. They found that the piston-engined twin-Commanders had averaged slightly over 3.4 engine-failure accidents per hundred-thousand hours, the second worst number of all aircraft under review. The most engine failures were suffered by the small-engine versions of the Piper Apache, at 6.9 failures per hundred thousand hours; the third-worst, the Beechcraft Travel Air, averaged 2.9 failures; the average for all models was only 1.6.

Countering the statistical evidence, Rockwell demonstration pilot Bob Hoover's famous airshow stunt routine, with the Shrike Commander, included a full aerobatic routine performed first with both engines, then with one engine out (and the critical engine, at that), then both engines out, and gliding. Then in his final airshow performance, in a supreme demonstration of conservation of momentum, he did all that, then landed the Shrike Commander dead stick (engines off), coasted the airplane down the runway then from the runway down the taxiway and silently let the craft roll slowly to a full stop right in front of the crowd.

The turboprop twin-Commanders—with much more powerful engines (and most with longer bodies, allowing greater rudder leverage, critical for single-engine control) – came out on the opposite end of the rankings, with one of the lowest rates of engine-failure accidents of all "light" twins examined, at only 0.4 per hundred-thousand hours.

Variants

Operators

Government operators

Military operators

Civil operators

 Talofa Airways

Notable accidents

 On 19 June 1964 Senator Ted Kennedy was a passenger in an Aero Commander 680 airplane flying in bad weather from Washington, D.C., to Massachusetts. It crashed into an apple orchard in the western Massachusetts town of Southampton on the final approach to the Barnes Municipal Airport near Westfield. The pilot and Edward Moss, one of Kennedy's aides, were killed. Kennedy suffered a severe back injury, a punctured lung, broken ribs and internal bleeding.
 World War II hero and actor Audie Murphy died in an Aero Commander 680 crash while flying as a passenger on 28 May 1971. The aircraft was flying in bad weather at night and was on approach to Roanoke, Virginia when it flew into the side of Brush Mountain outside Blacksburg, Virginia, West of Roanoke. Four others and the pilot were also killed.
 On 11 August 2002 photographer Galen Rowell, his wife Barbara Cushman Rowell, pilot Tom Reid and Reid's friend Carol McAffee were killed in an Aero Commander 690 crash near Eastern Sierra Regional Airport in Bishop, California.

Specifications (Rockwell Aero Commander 500S)

See also

References

Notes

Bibliography

External links

 
 
  (Legacy Support)
 
 
 

500
1940s United States military utility aircraft
1940s United States civil utility aircraft
Aircraft first flown in 1948
High-wing aircraft
Twin piston-engined tractor aircraft